Nudge, also known as buzz, is a feature of instant messaging software used to get the attention of another user, for example, by shaking the conversation window or playing a sound. The feature was first introduced in MSN Messenger 7.0, in 2005. The feature was called Buzz in Yahoo! Messenger and the feature had interoperability with MSN Messenger's Nudge.

XMPP extension protocol XEP-0224 calls this feature Attention.

MSN Messenger and Windows Live Messenger 
It is possible to change memory values of Windows Live Messenger to allow nudges to be sent unlimited with no time delay. This can be done manually with a memory editor such as Cheat Engine or with patching programs. Virtually all instant messaging programs that support MSNP (such as aMSN and Pidgin) allow this to be done without any extra hacks.

See also 
 Poke (Facebook)

References 

Instant messaging
Windows components